James Ursini (born May 10, 1947) is an American writer living in Los Angeles, and an educator. He received his master's degree in Theater Arts and a Doctorate in Film in 1975 from UCLA. He was born on May 10, 1947, in Pittsburgh, Pennsylvania.

He has written and/or edited over a dozen books—most with Alain Silver and two with Dominique Mainon (The Modern Amazons: Warrior Women On-Screen and Cinema of Obsession: Erotic Fixation and Love Gone Wrong in the Movies). He is noted for his work on film noir with Alain Silver (The Noir Style, The Film Noir Reader series, Film Noir, LA Noir, etc.) He has also done director studies on David Lean, Robert Aldrich, Preston Sturges, and Roger Corman and numerous DVD commentaries for Warner Bros., 20th Century-Fox, and the Criterion Collection. He has also produced several features and short documentaries as well as appearing in documentaries on film noir.

DVD commentaries
Boomerang, with film historian Alain Silver
Brute Force, with Alain Silver
 Burn!, with Alain Silver
Call Northside 777, with Alain Silver
Crossfire, with Alain Silver, plus audio interview excerpts of director Edward Dmytryk
The Dark Corner, with Alain Silver
Dark Victory, with CNN film critic Paul Clinton
Hobson's Choice, with Alain Silver
House of Bamboo, with Alain Silver
 Hustle, with Alain Silver
 Internal Affairs, with Alain Silver
Invisible Stripes, with Alain Silver
Kiss of Death, with Alain Silver
Lady in the Lake, with Alain Silver
 The Longest Yard, with Alain Silver
Nightmare Alley, with Alain Silver
Out of the Past
Panic in the Streets, with Alain Silver
The River's Edge, with Alain Silver
Smart Money, with Alain Silver
The Street with No Name, with Alain Silver
 Twilight, with Alain Silver
 The Wayward Bus, with Alain Silver
Where Danger Lives, with Alain Silver

External links

References

1947 births
American film critics
Film educators
American film historians
American male non-fiction writers
Film theorists
Writers from Pittsburgh
UCLA Film School alumni
Living people
Historians from Pennsylvania